Gennady Samosedenko (25 February 1942 – April 2022) was a Russian equestrian. He competed in the team jumping event at the 1968 Summer Olympics.

References

External links
 

1942 births
2022 deaths
Russian male equestrians
Soviet male equestrians
Olympic equestrians of the Soviet Union
Equestrians at the 1968 Summer Olympics
Sportspeople from Chelyabinsk